Colleretto may refer to:

 Colleretto Castelnuovo, comune in the Metropolitan City of Turin in the Italian region of Piedmont
 Colleretto Giacosa, comune in the Metropolitan City of Turin in the Italian region of Piedmont